Hemsworth is a constituency in West Yorkshire represented in the House of Commons since 1996 by Jon Trickett of the Labour Party.

Constituency profile
The constituency comprises former coal mining towns and villages that also provided some of the workforce for the manufacturing bases of the town of Barnsley to the south and cities of Wakefield and Leeds to the northwest. Many constituents still commute to these today. Nearby to the east over the border in North Yorkshire is Kellingley Colliery, which closed on 18 December 2015, marking the end of deep-pit coal mining in Britain. It is one of the Labour Party's longest held seats, having elected its first Labour MP in 1918, and been in continuous existence since that date.

History 
From the 1966 to February 1974 general elections (inclusive), Hemsworth was the safest seat for any party in the UK: the Labour vote had peaked in 1966 at 85.39% and consistently exceeded 80% from 1935 until October 1974 when the Liberal Party contested the seat for the first time since 1923. Successive boundary changes removed certain ex-mining communities to the new Barnsley East constituency in 1983: this and the addition of the more Conservative-inclined ward of Wakefield South in 1997 slightly reduced Labour's dominance, but Hemsworth remained a safe seat in the 2017 election. However, in 2019 the majority was cut from over 10,000 to just 1,180 as Labour's vote collapsed in Northern former mining seats, making it marginal for future elections.

Present member
The incumbent member at Westminster is Jon Trickett, former Leader of City of Leeds Council.

Boundaries 

1918–1950: The Urban Districts of Cudworth and Royston, the Rural District of Hemsworth, and part of the Rural District of Barnsley.

1950–1983: The Urban Districts of Cudworth, Dearne, Hemsworth, and Royston, and the Rural District of Hemsworth.

1983–1997: The City of Wakefield wards of Crofton and Ackworth; Featherstone; Hemsworth; South Elmsall; and South Kirkby.

1997–2010: The City of Wakefield wards of Crofton and Ackworth; Featherstone; Hemsworth; South Elmsall; South Kirkby; and Wakefield South.

2010–present: The City of Wakefield wards of Ackworth, North Elmsall and Upton; Crofton, Ryhill and Walton; Featherstone; Hemsworth; South Elmsall and South Kirkby; and Wakefield South.

This constituency covers the towns of Hemsworth, Featherstone, South Kirkby & Moorthorpe and South Elmsall plus the southern part of Wakefield (Sandal, Agbrigg, Belle Vue) and the villages of Ackworth, Crofton, Fitzwilliam, Upton, Sharlston, Streethouse, Walton and Notton in the City of Wakefield district.

Members of Parliament

Elections

Elections in the 2010s

Elections in the 2000s

:

Elections in the 1990s

Elections in the 1980s

Elections in the 1970s

Elections in the 1960s

Elections in the 1950s

Elections in the 1940s 

General Election 1939–40:

Another general election was required to take place before the end of 1940. The political parties had been making preparations for an election to take place from 1939 and by the end of this year, the following candidates had been selected; 
Labour: George Griffiths
Conservative:

Elections in the 1930s

Elections in the 1920s

Elections in the 1910s

See also 
 1934 Hemsworth by-election
 1946 Hemsworth by-election
 1991 Hemsworth by-election
 1996 Hemsworth by-election
 List of parliamentary constituencies in West Yorkshire

Notes

References

Sources 

Parliamentary constituencies in Yorkshire and the Humber
Constituencies of the Parliament of the United Kingdom established in 1918
Politics of Wakefield
Hemsworth